Wired may refer to:

Arts, entertainment, and media

Music
 Wired (Jeff Beck album), 1976
 Wired (Hugh Cornwell album), 1993
 Wired (Mallory Knox album), 2017
 "Wired", a song by Prism from their album Beat Street
 "Wired", a song by Sevendust from their eponymous debut album

Television
 Wired (TV series), a 2008 British television miniseries
 Wired, 1988 TV series produced by  Tim Graham
 "Wired", a 2005 two-part episode of Power Rangers: SPD
 "Wired", a 2002 two-part episode of  The Zeta Project animated series

Other uses in arts, entertainment, and media
 Wired (book), a 1984 book by Bob Woodward about the American actor and comedian John Belushi
 Wired (film), a 1989 adaptation of the book by Bob Woodward
 Wired (novel), a 2005 science fiction novel by Douglas E. Richards about a brilliant genetic engineer who discovers how to temporarily achieve savant-like capabilities.
 Wired (magazine), an American science and technology magazine and website
 Wired UK, the UK offshoot of the American magazine
 Wired, the Italian version of the American magazine
 WTDY-FM, formerly known as "Wired 96.5", a radio station at 96.5 FM licensed to Philadelphia, Pennsylvania

Other uses
 Wired (demoparty), a Belgian annual demoparty which ran from 1994 to 1998
 Wired, an energy drink containing caffeine and taurine
 Wired, a slang term for being under the influence of caffeine
 Wired communication, the transmission of data over a wire-based communication technology
 Workforce Innovation in Regional Economic Development (WIRED), a branch of the United States Department of Labor

See also
 Wire (disambiguation)